Club Deportivo Isla Cristina were a Spanish football team based in Isla Cristina, in the autonomous community of Andalusia. Founded in 1934 and dissolved in 1999, they played their home matches at Campo Municipal de Isla Cristina, with a capacity of 5,000 people.

History
Founded in 1934, Isla Cristina played in the regional leagues until 1994, when they achieved promotion to Tercera División. In the 1997 play-offs, the club achieved a first-ever promotion to Segunda División B after leading their group.

After an impressive ninth position in the 1997–98 season (which included a 4–4 aggregate victory on away goals over La Liga side Sevilla FC in the 1997–98 Copa del Rey), the club had a disastrous 1998–99 campaign, which ended with just four points in 38 rounds, and a record number of seven managers during the entire season; the record of managers was only surpassed by CD Eldense in 2017.

Shortly after Isla Cristina's relegation, the club folded, and a new club called Isla Cristina FC was founded shortly after.

Season to season

2 seasons in Segunda División B
3 seasons in Tercera División

References

External links
BDFutbol team profile
Fútbol Regional team profile 

Defunct football clubs in Andalusia
Association football clubs established in 1934
Association football clubs disestablished in 1999
1934 establishments in Spain
1999 disestablishments in Spain